Wilbur Harris (28 May 1912 – 28 June 1981) was an Australian rules footballer who played for South Melbourne in the Victorian Football League (VFL).

Harris was a ruckman, recruited from South Australian club West Torrens.  The collection of players recruited from interstate in 1932/1933 became known as South Melbourne's "Foreign Legion".

He originally had trouble establishing a spot in the senior South Melbourne side, but was selected as 19th man in the 1934 VFL Grand Final. By 1937 Harris was a regular in the senior team. He kicked 12 of his 19 career goals that year. In 1941 he was cleared to play for Williamstown in the Victorian Football Association, but never played for them, returning to play six more games for South Melbourne.

Notes

References

 Holmesby, Russell and Main, Jim (2007). The Encyclopedia of AFL Footballers. 7th ed. Melbourne: Bas Publishing.
 Boyles Football Photos: Wilbur Harris

1912 births
1981 deaths
Australian rules footballers from South Australia
Sydney Swans players
West Torrens Football Club players